Astroblepus rengifoi is a species of catfish of the family Astroblepidae. It can be found on the Atrato River in Colombia.

Named in honor of entomologist Santiago Rengifo Salcedo (1913-1965), for his “ceaseless work for the advancement of biological science in Colombia”.

References

Bibliography
Eschmeyer, William N., ed. 1998. Catalog of Fishes. Special Publication of the Center for Biodiversity Research and Information, num. 1, vol. 1–3. California Academy of Sciences. San Francisco, California, United States. 2905. .

Astroblepus
Fish described in 1960
Freshwater fish of Colombia